Transparent Things is a novel by Vladimir Nabokov published in 1972. It was originally written in English.

Plot summary
This short novel tells the story of Hugh Person, a young American editor, and the memory of his four trips to a small village in Switzerland over the course of nearly two decades.

Synopsis
Person first visits the village as a young man, along with his father. In his second trip, Person's publisher sends him to interview R., a gifted and eccentric author. His third trip involves tragedy, murder, and madness. Finally, Person's fourth trip provides an opportunity for reflection on his turbulent past. In recounting Person's story, the narrator(s) guide(s) the reader through themes of time, love, authorship, and the metaphysics of memory.

Critical reception
In The New York Times Book Review, writer Mavis Gallant wrote, "Vladimir Nabokov, having spent his life building the Taj Mahal, has decided at the age of 73—for his own amusement and incidentally for our pleasure—to construct a small mock replica. The miniature is not flawed, no, but the most splendid features of the great model have been just slightly parodied, out of playfulness almost." Gallant found the short novel to be "as casual, as unpredictable, as eccentric and as daunting as Mr. Nabokov's genius."

References

External links
New York Times Profile of Nabokov at 72 Writing Transparent Things

1972 American novels
Novels by Vladimir Nabokov
Novels set in Switzerland